Blizhneosinovsky is a rural locality (a khutor) and the administrative center of Blizhneositinovskoye Rural Settlement, Surovikinsky District, Volgograd Oblast, Russia. The population was 639 as of 2010. There are 10 streets.

Geography 
Blizhneosinovsky is located on the left bank of the Chir River, 32 km southeast of Surovikino (the district's administrative centre) by road. Buratsky is the nearest rural locality.

References 

Rural localities in Surovikinsky District